Marco Maccarini (born 22 July 1976 in Turin) is an Italian television personality known for presenting TRL Italy, the Italian version of Total Request Live broadcast by MTV Italia, and Festivalbar, broadcast by Mediaset’s Italia 1.

References

External links
 The official website   
 The official fanclub

1976 births
Living people
Mass media people from Turin
Italian television personalities